There are three metropolitan planning organizations (MPO) in New Jersey. The organizations are the main decision-making forums for selecting projects for the Statewide Transportation Improvement Program (STIP) in deliberations involving the New Jersey Department of Transportation (NJDOT), the New Jersey Transit Corporation (NJT), county and municipal transportation planners and engineers, other transportation implementing agencies, the public and elected officials at the state, county, and municipal levels.

The state’s three MPO are:

The North Jersey Transportation Planning  Authority (NJTPA), MPO ID# 34198200, includes Bergen, Essex, Hudson, Hunterdon, Middlesex,  Monmouth, Morris, Ocean, Passaic, Somerset, Sussex, Union, and Warren counties in the Gateway Region, Skylands Region, and on northern Jersey Shore.
The Delaware Valley Regional Planning Commission (DVRPC), MPO ID# 42196501, includes Burlington, Camden, Gloucester and Mercer counties in New Jersey as well Bucks, Chester, Delaware, Monthomery, and Philadelphia in Pennsylvania in the Delaware Valley
The South Jersey Transportation Planning Organization (SJTPO),  MPO ID# 34199300, covering Atlantic, Cape May, Cumberland and Salem counties in South Jersey.

Projects that are identified as potential candidates for inclusion in the regional 
transportation improvement programs of each of the three MPOs are subject to 
intensive screening to verify project scope, status, schedule, and cost.  The resulting “pool”
of projects is analyzed independently by NJDOT, NJ TRANSIT, and the MPOs to assign 
each project a priority based on the extent to which it would advance identified regional and 
statewide objectives, such as objectives set forth in the state and regional long-range 
transportation plans, the New Jersey Capital Investment Strategy, air quality objectives, and 
the broad social and economic goals of the State Development and Redevelopment Plan.
  
NJDOT develops and circulates revenue projections for planning purposes to each of the 
MPOs, based on the best current assessment of available state, federal, and other funds.  
NJDOT, NJ TRANSIT and each of the three MPOs after intensive discussions and forums
negotiate a list of deliverable transportation projects that best fit the composite statewide and 
regional priorities within a financially constrained program.

See also
List of metropolitan planning organizations in the United States
Regional Plan Association
Port Authority of New York and New Jersey
New York Metropolitan Transportation Council
South Jersey Transportation Authority
Delaware River Port Authority
Delaware River and Bay Authority
Delaware River Joint Toll Bridge Commission
New Jersey Turnpike Authority
New Jersey Sports and Exposition Authority
New Jersey Transit

References

External links
North Jersey Transportation Planning  Authority (NJTPA)
Delaware Valley Regional Planning Organization
South Jersey Transportation Planning Organization

Transportation in New Jersey
Transportation planning
Urban planning
New Jersey